Francesca Arundale (born 1847 in Brighton, England; died 23 March 1924 in India) was an English theosophist and freemason.

She became a member of the Theosophical Society Adyar in 1881 and was a close friend of Helena Blavatsky and Annie Besant. In 1896 she became a member of Le Droit Humain. She also participated at Besant's foundation of the first London Lodge of "Le Droit Humain". 
She also lived many years in Germany. In 1902 she moved to Adyar. Her adopted son, who was also her great-nephew, George Arundale later became president of the Theosophical Society Adyar. In India she was especially active in the Varanasi branch of the T.S.

Works
 Idea of Rebirth Including a Translation of an Essay on Re-incarnation. Kessinger Publishing, Whitefish 1998; 
 My Guest, H.P. Blavatsky. Kessinger Publishing, Whitefish 2004; 

1874 births
1924 deaths
English Theosophists
People from Brighton
English Freemasons